Jimena Rumini Espinoza Vecco (born September 16, 1989 in Lima) is a Peruvian model and beauty pageant titleholder, who won Miss Perú 2014 and represented Peru at the Miss Universe 2014 pageant.

Early life

Jimena Espinoza is graduate Marketing at San Ignacio de Loyola University. Jimena is Top Model Professional.

Pageantry

Miss Perú 2014

Espinoza was crowned as Miss Perú 2014 represented Lima and competed at Miss Universe 2014. The 61st Miss Peru pageant held on April 12, 2014 in Parque de la Amistad in Lima, Peru. The outgoing titleholder of Miss Perú 2013, Cindy Mejía of Lima, crowned her successor at the end of the event. The pageant televised live on Panamericana Television.

Miss Universe 2014

Espinoza represented Peru at Miss Universe 2014, but didn't make it to the Top 15.

References

External links
Official website

People from Lima
Peruvian female models
1989 births
Living people
Peruvian beauty pageant winners
Universidad San Ignacio de Loyola alumni
Miss Universe 2014 contestants